Control4 is a provider of automation and networking systems for homes and businesses, offering a personalized and unified smart home system to automate and control connected devices including lighting, audio, video, climate control, intercom, and security. The Control4 platform interoperates with more than 13,500 third-party products and is available in over 100 countries. As of August 2018, it manages 370,000 homes. The company is based in Salt Lake City, Utah. Control4 was a publicly traded company (on the NASDAQ stock exchange under the stock symbol CTRL) from 2013 until 2019, when it merged with SnapAV.

History
Founded in 2003 by Eric Smith, Will West, and Mark Morgan, Control4 debuted at the 2004 CEDIA Expo home technology trade show and released its first products later that year, as an early entrant in the home automation market. Smith and West had previously created PHAST, an early home control system that was acquired by AMX in 1997; and STSN, a provider of Internet service for the hospitality industry. Control4 received funding from Foundation Capital, Thomas Weisel Venture Partners, Signal Peak Ventures, Frazier Technology Ventures, and Cisco Systems prior to its IPO on August 2, 2013. CEO Martin Plaehn joined Control4 in September 2011.

In August 2019, Control4 completed a merger with consumer technology designer and manufacturer SnapAV. John Heyman currently serves as CEO, and the Company was rebranded as "SnapOne."

Products and services
Control4's home automation systems have been likened to an operating system for the home. The company offers products to manage climate control, home network, home security, intercom, multi-room audio, and smart lighting, offering a universal remote and voice control. It offers items such as a smart doorbell, smart outlets, security cameras, thermostats, centralized lighting panels, motion sensors, and KNX devices. The systems can be controlled from the Control4 smartphone app, keypads fitted to the walls, a traditional remote, or a portable touch screen. 

In addition to its own products and services, Control4 supports more than 13,500 third-party products, including Amazon Alexa-enabled speaker devices, the Google Nest smart home thermostat, streaming services like Spotify and Netflix, Sonos music system, Apple TV, and products from Sony, Sub-Zero, Roku, LG, Samsung, Bose, Denon, Honeywell, Yale, and Lutron. With Control4, a homeowner could control "the ventilation in the garage, the music streaming to speakers in multiple rooms of his home, every light, the TV, the thermostat, even the Blu-Ray player in the guest house" from an iOS or Android device.

Installation of the Control4 system is done through a network of dealers who install the hardware and configure and customize the software to unify the homeowner's technology. A Control4 controller acts as the "brain" of the home, connecting to the home network and allowing the electronic devices and systems in the home to work together. There are various controllers available, including the CA-1, which offers Zigbee, Z-Wave, and Wi-Fi connectivity, and the EA-series controllers, which include streaming audio and HDMI out. The controllers come with touch screen panels or keypads, with versions available on both iOS and Android, and with Amazon Alexa compatibility.

In 2012, Control4 released its Simple Device Discovery Protocol (SDDP), which makes products embedded with the code automatically discoverable on a Control4 network. The company licenses the protocol to other vendors for their products, with more than 7,500 SDDP-embedded products as of June 2019.

In May 2019, Control4 debuted a new version of its operating system, Smart Home OS 3. The upgrade is designed to let users more easily customize and make changes to their Control4 Smart Home systems. With the upgrade, Control4 added streaming of MQA files, making it the first home automation company to support the high-resolution audio format.

In June 2019, streaming and download service Qobuz partnered with Control4 to bring hi-res music streaming to home automation installations, allowing Control4 users to upgrade to hi-res sound.

Control4 sells products under three brands: 

 Control4 for intelligent lighting, multi-room audio, multi-room video, HVAC, home automation controllers, and smart home interfaces such as touch screens, keypads, door stations, and the Control4 app.
 Pakedge for home network infrastructure products such as routers, switches, access points, IP cameras, and wireless controllers. 
 Triad for speakers and audio amplifiers.

As of June 2019, Control4 was selling its products through nearly 6,000 authorized Control4 dealers, in addition to partnering with home builders including Toll Brothers and Arthur Rutenberg Homes.

Acquisitions
Control4 has made several high profile acquisitions in the last decade, greatly adding to its lineup of products and services. In 2015, the company acquired Australian-based Nexus Technologies Pty., or more commonly called "Leaf," a high-end manufacturer of audio/video distribution products. Control4 acquired cloud enabled network hardware manufacturer Pakedge Device and Software in 2016; its largest acquisition to date. In 2017, Control4 acquired Triad, a high-end audio products company. On January 10, 2018, Control4 acquired Ihiji, a provider of remote monitoring services. In February 2019, Control4 acquired Neeo, a Switzerland-based company specializing in multi-device remote controls, for $11 million plus the assumption of $4.6 million in debt.

References 

What is Control4? The Less Talked About Home Automation Solution Smarthomemuse

External links 
 

Home automation companies
Smart home hubs
Products introduced in 2003
2003 establishments in Utah
Companies based in Salt Lake City
Companies formerly listed on the Nasdaq
American companies established in 2003
2013 initial public offerings
2019 mergers and acquisitions